Pseudofulvibacter marinus is a Gram-negative, strictly aerobic, rod-shaped and non-spore-forming bacterium from the genus of Pseudofulvibacter. Pseudofulvibacter marinus has been isolated from seawater from the coast of the Yellow Sea.

References

Flavobacteria
Bacteria described in 2016